Giuliano Stroe (born June 18, 2004) is a Romanian boxer, gymnast, and bodybuilder.
 
In 2009, he was recorded in the Guinness Book of World Records after setting the record for the fastest ever  hand-walk with a weight ball between his legs.

On February 24, 2010, he broke the world record for the number of 90-degree push-ups, which is an exercise where push-ups are performed without letting your feet touch the ground. Stroe managed 20 90-degree push-ups, beating his previous record of 12, live on Romanian TV. By 2011, Giuliano could do up to 40 90-degree push-ups.

Other records include: human flag (1 minute 32 seconds), human flag pullups (31), and muscle ups (41).

References

links
 https://youtube.com/user/GiulianoStroeOficial/
 https://www.facebook.com%2FGiuliano-Stroe/

Romanian male weightlifters
Living people
2004 births
Romanian children
21st-century Romanian people